Ironton High School (IHS) is a public high school in Ironton, Ohio, United States. It is the only public high school in the Ironton City School District.

Athletics
The Ironton Fighting Tigers are a member of the Ohio Valley Conference. Currently, the other members of the conference include Chesapeake High School (Panthers), Coal Grove High School (Hornets), Fairland High School (Dragons), South Point High School (Pointers), Rock Hill High School (Redmen), Portsmouth High School (Trojans), Gallia Academy High School (Blue Devils).

Ohio High School Athletic Association State Championships

 Boys Football – 1979, 1989 
 Boys Baseball – 1972 
 Boys Golf – 1995, 1996, 1997 

See also Ohio High School Athletic Conferences

Football
The Ironton Football team was coached by Bob Lutz prior to 2012. Lutz set the record for the most career wins in Ohio High School Football with 381 wins and also led them to their two State Championships in 1979 and 1989. In the last two seasons (2019 & 2020) they have been in the state championship game under head coach Trevon Pendleton in his first 3 seasons as head coach.

Baseball
Mike Burcham was Bob Lutz longtime assistant and coached Ironton to its only State Baseball Championship in 1972.

Notable alumni
Coy Bacon, former NFL player
George McAfee, former NFL player, member of Pro Football Hall of Fame. 
Clint McElroy, radio personality and podcaster

References

External links
 

Ironton, Ohio
High schools in Lawrence County, Ohio
Public high schools in Ohio